The Akal Takht (Gurmukhi: ਅਕਾਲ ਤਖ਼ਤ) ("Throne of the Timeless One") is one of five takhts (seats of power) of the Sikhs. It is located in the Darbar Sahib (Golden Temple) complex in Amritsar, Punjab, India. The Akal Takht (originally called Akal Bunga) was built by Shri Guru Hargobind Ji as a place of justice and consideration of temporal issues; the highest seat of earthly authority of the Khalsa (the collective body of the Sikhs) and the place of the Jathedar, the highest spokesman of the Sikhs.

The position of the jathedar is disputed between the Shiromani Gurdwara Parbandhak Committee who appointed Giani Harpreet Singh as the acting jathedar in 2018, and the Sarbat Khalsa organized by some Sikh organizations in 2015. Due to the political imprisonment of Hawara, Dhian Singh Mand was appointed as the acting jathedar by the Sarbat Khalsa. The Shiromani Gurdwara Prabandhak Committee however refused to accept its authority.

History 
Originally known as Akal Bunga, the building directly opposite the Harmandir Sahib was founded by sixth Sikh Guru, Guru Hargobind, as a symbol of political sovereignty and where spiritual and temporal concerns of the Sikh people could be addressed. Along with Baba Buddha and Bhai Gurdas, the sixth Sikh Guru built a 9-foot-high concrete slab. When Guru Hargobind revealed the platform on 15 June 1606, he put on two swords: one indicated his spiritual authority (piri) and the other, his temporal authority (miri).

In the 18th century, Ahmed Shah Abdali and Massa Rangar led a series of attacks on the Akal Takht and Harmandir Sahib. Takht which is on the first floor was rebuilt in brick between 1770 and 1780, under Sultan-ul-Qaum Jassa Singh Ahluwalia (1718–1783) – the leader of the Sikh Confederacy in Punjab.

Hari Singh Nalwa, a general of Ranjit Singh, the maharaja, decorated the Akhal Takht with gold. On 4 June 1984, the Akal Takht was damaged when the Indian Army stormed Harmandir Sahib under the order of Indira Gandhi, then Prime minister of India, during Operation Blue Star.

Design 
The Akal Takht was built on a site where there existed only a high mound of earth across a wide-open space. It was a place where Guru Hargobind played as a child. He was surrounded by insignia of royalty such as the parasol and the flywhisk. Later, there was an open-air semi-circular structure built on marble pillars and a gilded interior section. There were also painted wall panels depicting Europeans.

The modern building is a five-story structure with marble inlay and a gold-leafed dome. Three of the stories were added by Ranjit Singh in the 1700s. Contemporary restoration work found a layer of paint decorated lime plaster that might have been part of the original structure but later than the time of Harminder.

Operation Blue Star 

In July 1983, the Sikh political party Akali Dal's President Harcharan Singh Longowal and the jathedar of the Akal Takht invited the fourteenth jathedar of Damdami taksal Jarnail Singh Bhindranwale, who was on the run for radicalized militancy in Punjab, popular in much of rural Punjab, to hide in the Golden Temple Complex, later moving to the Akal Takht to protect himself from getting arrested. Between 3 June and 8 June 1984, the Indian army conducted a counter-insurgency operation, ordered by Prime Minister Indira Gandhi, to arrest Bhindranwale. The Akal Takht was heavily damaged during this operation by the Indian Army. Bhindranwale was killed in action during exchange of fire between the armed Militants and the Indian Army.

Re-building 
After Operation Blue Star, the Akal Takht was rebuilt by the Jathedar of Budha Dal, Baba Santa Singh. Many institutions such as the Damdami Taksal felt that the Nihang Singhs should not have taken money from the government to rebuild the Takht.

A few years later, Bhindranwale's successor from Damdami Taksal, Baba Thakur Singh, had the Akal Takht demolished, and rebuilt after resolutions were passed by Sarbat Khalsa 1986.

Gallery

References

Sources 
 Harjinder Singh Dilgeer The Akal Takht, Sikh University Press, 1980.
 Harjinder Singh Dilgeer Sikh Twareekh Vich Akal Takht Sahib Da Role, Sikh University Press 2005.
 Harjinder Singh Dilgeer Akal Takht Sahib, concept and role, Sikh University Press 2005.
 Harjinder Singh Dilgeer Sikh Twareekh, Sikh University Press 2008.
 Mohinder Singh Josh Akal Takht Tay is da Jathedar 2005.
 Darshi A. R. The Gallant Defender
 Singh P. The Golden Temple. South Asia Books 1989. .
 Singh K. (ed.) New insights into Sikh art. Marg Publications. 2003. .
 Nomination of Sri Harimandir Sahib for inclusion on the UNESCO World Heritage List Vol.1 Nomination Dossier, India 2003.
 Macauliffe, M. A. The Sikh religion: Its gurus sacred writings and authors Low Price Publications, 1903. .

External links 

 WorldGurudwara.com Akal Takht, Amritsar established in 1606
 Takht Sri Darbar Sahib Akal Takht
 Shri Akaal Takhat images

Buildings and structures in Amritsar
Gurdwaras in Punjab, India
Sikh places
Tourist attractions in Amritsar